Edinburgh of the Seven Seas is the only settlement of the island of Tristan da Cunha, a part of the British Overseas Territory Saint Helena, Ascension and Tristan da Cunha in the South Atlantic Ocean. Locally, it is referred to as The Settlement or The Village.

Edinburgh of the Seven Seas is regarded as the most remote permanent settlement on Earth, located over 1,500 miles (2400 kilometres) from the nearest human settlement, on Saint Helena.

History

The settlement was founded on the island of Tristan da Cunha in 1816 by a Sergeant William Glass from Kelso, Scottish Borders after the UK annexed Tristan da Cunha. A military garrison was maintained on the islands as a guard against any French attempts to rescue Napoleon, who was imprisoned on Saint Helena. The military garrison remained until the end of World War II.

It is named after Prince Alfred, Duke of Edinburgh, the second son of Queen Victoria, in honour of his visit to the island in 1867.

Edinburgh of the Seven Seas is the only major settlement of Tristan da Cunha, and contains a small port, the Administrator's residence, and the post office. It was damaged in a volcanic eruption on the island in 1961, which forced the entire population to abandon the settlement and evacuate to Calshot, Hampshire in the UK. The eruption destroyed the settlement's crayfish factory.

After the return of most of the islanders in 1963, the settlement was rebuilt. The harbour at Edinburgh was named Calshot Harbour, after their temporary home during the eruption.

Geography

Climate
The archipelago has a wet oceanic climate under the Köppen system with mild temperatures, but consistent moderate to heavy rainfall and very limited sunshine, due to the persistent westerly winds. Under the Trewartha classification, Tristan da Cunha has a humid subtropical climate due to the lack of cold weather, and it has a mild oceanic climate (Cfb) according to the Köppen climate classification, with an absence of extreme temperatures. The number of rainy days is comparable to the Aleutian Islands at a much higher latitude in the northern hemisphere, while sunshine hours are comparable to Juneau, Alaska, 20° farther from the equator. Sandy Point on the east coast is reputed to be the warmest and driest place on the island, being in the lee of the prevailing winds.

Transport
There is one road, nicknamed the "M1", which connects the town with Potato Patches (or The Patches), the primary agricultural area, and is used by the few private cars on the island. Paved paths provide walking access to buildings around town. A bus service called Potato Patches Flier (using a 24-seat Isuzu mini school bus from Cape Town, South Africa) is available free to pensioners to travel to the Patches and stops along the road.

All motor vehicles on the island have Tristan da Cunha plates consisting of letters TDC and 2 or 3 numbers.

The settlement has a small harbour named after the village of Calshot, where the population of Tristan da Cunha stayed following the volcanic eruption, with berths accessible by small vessels only. The island has around 10 scheduled ship visits per year for tourists and island residents to travel to/from the island on multi-day trips from South Africa or Namibia.

Gallery

Art
Graphic artist Rolf Weijburg produced an etch of Edinburgh of the Seven Seas and other places on the island of Tristan da Cunha.

Local government
The island's local affairs are managed by the Island Council, a 14-member administration that meets six times a year and is elected every three years.

Government services
The town is home to the island's emergency services, which comprise one ambulance (a Toyota Hilux operated by Camogli Hospital), one fire engine (a Land Rover Defender with a small ladder) and one police car (Land Rover Series).

The town administration also has a vehicle for official use.

Places of interest and attractions
Most buildings in town are single story, with the largest being the factory and the tallest being St Joseph's Church.

 St. Mary's Anglican Church – built 1923
 St. Joseph Catholic Church – built 1995–96 and replaced earlier church from 1983
 St Mary's School – built 1975
 Camogli Hospital – built in 1971 to replace Station Hospital (c. 1940s)
 Calshot Harbour – built 1967
 Prince Philip Hall and the Albatross Bar
 Tristan Thatched House Museum
 Agriculture Department warehouse
 Tristan Island Store – only supermarket on the island
 Tristan Post Office, Tourism Centre and Café da Cunha – opened 2009
 Administration Building – home to Island Council
 Crayfish Canning Factory – built 1963
 Park 61 – volcanic park site
 The Potato Patches – an area with potato farms have been used for over 150 years. In the area are camping huts.

Notable people 
William Glass (1786-1853), founder of the settlement
Conrad Glass (b. 1961), police officer

References

External links
 Description of the settlement
 Tourism Information (Archived)

Tristan da Cunha
Populated places established in 1816
Populated places in Saint Helena, Ascension and Tristan da Cunha
1816 establishments in the British Empire
1816 establishments in Africa